William Lyon may refer to:
William Lyon (film editor) (1903–1974), American film editor
William John Lyon (1898–1941), New Zealand politician
William Lyon (bishop) (died 1617), English bishop
William Lyon (priest) (1883–1961), Anglican Archdeacon of Loughborough
William Durie Lyon (died 1893), Ontario businessman and politician
William C. Lyon (born 1841), American politician
William P. Lyon (1822–1913), Wisconsin jurist and soldier
William Radenhurst Richmond Lyon (1820–1854), first reeve of Richmond, Ontario
Bill Lyon (1886–?), Australian rules footballer
Billy Lyon (born 1973), American football player
William Lyon (general) (1923–2020), USAF general

See also

William the Lion, King of the Scots
William Lyons (disambiguation)
Lyon (disambiguation)